Playwrights Canada Press is a Canadian publishing house founded in 1984 by the Playwrights Guild of Canada. It was incorporated in 2000 as an independent company.

Notable books
The Adventures of a Black Girl in Search of God, Djanet Sears (2003)
Almighty Voice and His Wife, Daniel David Moses (1991)
Annie Mae's Movement, Yvette Nolan (1998)
The Crackwalker, Judith Thompson (1980)
The December Man (L'homme de décembre), Colleen Murphy (2007)
Drag Queens on Trial, Sky Gilbert (1994)
The Drawer Boy, Michael Healey (1999)
I, Claudia, Kristen Thomson (2001)
The Last Wife, Kate Hennig (2015)
Lilies, Michel Marc Bouchard, trans. Linda Gaboriau (1990)
Lion in the Streets, Judith Thompson (1992)
Maggie and Pierre, Linda Griffiths (1980)
Mary's Wedding, Stephen Massicotte (2002)
The Melville Boys, Norm Foster (1984)
The Monument, Colleen Wagner (1996)
Palace of the End, Judith Thompson (2007)
Scorched, Wajdi Mouawad, trans. Linda Gaboriau (2005)
This is War, Hannah Moscovitch (2015)
Unidentified Human Remains and the True Nature of Love, Brad Fraser (1989)
Zastrozzi, The Master of Discipline, George F. Walker (1979)

Awards and nominations
Playwrights Canada Press has been nominated for 86 Governor General's Awards, 82 for English-language Drama and 4 for French to English translation, resulting in 21 wins over its 33-year history.

Governor General's Award for English-language Drama

§as Playwrights Canada

Governor General's Award for French to English translation

See also

Playwrights Guild of Canada
Theatre of Canada
List of Canadian Plays

References

External links
 

Book publishing companies of Canada
Publishing companies established in 1984
Small press publishing companies